The 2013 Superliga Colombiana was the second edition of the Superliga Colombiana. Santa Fe was the winner of the tournament.

Teams

Matches

First leg

Second leg

External links
Superliga Postobon
Superliga, Dimayor.com
Regulations

Superliga Colombiana
Superliga Colombiana 2013
Superliga Colombiana